Frances Jane Ross (1869–1950) was a New Zealand school principal known as "a pioneer in women's education".

Early life and education
She was born in 1869 in Otepopo (now Herbert), to a Scots father and Irish mother.

Frances Ross was an early woman graduate of the University of Otago. She was awarded her BA in 1890, and an MA in 1900.

Before enrolling at the university, Ross had been a foundation pupil of Girton College, a Dunedin school founded by Otago's first woman graduate Caroline Freeman. After her BA, she returned to Girton as first assistant. She took over as the school's principal and owner when Freeman moved to her second Girton College in Christchurch.

Career

Ross was the founding principal of Columba College, a Presbyterian secondary school for boarders and day girls.

After retiring from Columba College, Ross took up voluntary work for the Young Women's Christian Association of New Zealand. She was a member of its Dunedin board from 1930 until 1944, Dunedin president for three years, and World YWCA Council member for six years. In 1944 she was made a life member of the Dunedin YWCA.

During the Second World War, Frances Ross returned to the teaching workforce as warden of St Margaret's College, principal of the Dunedin Presbyterian Women's Training Institute, and teacher at 
St Hilda's Collegiate School.

References

1869 births
1950 deaths
New Zealand schoolteachers
People from Otago